Richard Boyle, 4th Earl of Shannon (12 May 1809 – 1 August 1868), styled Viscount Boyle until 1842, was a British politician of the Whig party. He served as Member of Parliament for Cork County from 1830 to 1832.

Background
Boyle was the son of Henry Boyle, 3rd Earl of Shannon and his wife, Sarah, daughter of John Hyde of Castle Hyde and his wife, Sarah Burton. Hyde was a descendant of the Hyde family of Denchworth in Berkshire (now Oxfordshire).

Political career
Boyle was elected a Member of Parliament in the 1830 United Kingdom general election and re-elected in the 1831 United Kingdom general election. 

The Reform Act 1832 increased the number of individuals entitled to vote, increasing the size of electorate by 50–80%, and allowing a total of 653,000 adult males (around one in five) to vote, in a population of some 14 million. 

In the 1832 United Kingdom general election which followed, Cork County was allowed to elect two Members of Parliament instead of one. Richard failed to be re-elected, his seat taken by Feargus O'Connor, a leader of the Chartist movement, and Garrett Standish Barry. Barry was a Roman Catholic, the first one elected to Parliament following the Catholic Relief Act 1829. On 22 April 1842, his father died and Boyle succeeded him. He held no other political office until his death.

Family
On 28 May 1832, Lord Shannon married Emily Henrietta Seymour in London. She was a daughter of Lord George Seymour-Conway and Isabella Hamilton. His father-in-law was a son of Francis Seymour-Conway, 1st Marquess of Hertford and his wife Lady Isabella Fitzroy. His mother-in-law was a daughter of the Reverend George Hamilton, Canon of Windsor (1718–1787) and his wife Elizabeth Onslow.

They had two sons:

Henry Bentinck Boyle, 5th Earl of Shannon (22 November 1833 – 8 February 1890).
Frederick James Boyle (16 September 1835 – 10 October 1861).

References

Burke's Peerage, 107th edition (2004)

External links

Page of "Gentleman's Magazine" listing the children of the 3rd Earl of Shannon
Page of "Families of County Cork" giving a profile of the Hyde family
Page of "Burke's Landed Gentry" listing his maternal ancestors

1809 births
1868 deaths
Members of the Parliament of the United Kingdom for County Cork constituencies (1801–1922)
UK MPs 1830–1831
UK MPs 1831–1832
UK MPs who inherited peerages
Richard
Earls of Shannon
Younger sons of earls